Samkhar Gewog (Dzongkha: བསམ་མཁར་) is a gewog (village block) of Trashigang District, Bhutan.

References

Gewogs of Bhutan
Trashigang District